Factory Creek is a stream in the U.S. state of Georgia. It is a tributary to the Chattahoochee River.

Factory Creek was named for the fact its waters powered a textile mill along its course in the 1850s.

References

Rivers of Georgia (U.S. state)
Rivers of Early County, Georgia